Lee Young-pyo (born 23 April 1977) is a retired South Korean professional footballer who played as a right-footed left back. Lee was recognized for his speed and dribbling skills. His former manager Martin Jol once called him "the best left back in Holland".

Prior to playing for PSV Eindhoven and Tottenham Hotspur, Lee started his professional career at FC Seoul, then known as Anyang LG Cheetahs in the Korean K League and then spent two years with PSV Eindhoven of the Netherlands, earning high acclaim from PSV Coach Guus Hiddink, who had previously coached Lee and South Korea during the 2002 World Cup. Recognized as the best left-back in the Netherlands after the 2004–05 season, Tottenham signed him amidst heavy competition with several Serie A clubs. He transferred to Tottenham in August 2005.

On 19 November 2008, Lee became the seventh Korean player to earn 100 caps in a World Cup qualifier against Saudi Arabia. During the 2011 AFC Asian Cup, Lee captained the national team twice after the substitutions of the regular Korean captain, Park Ji-sung.

Post-retirement, he received high accolades from professionals and laymen for his spot-on commentaries and uncanny ability to predict various football related matters. So much so that some took to comparing him to Paul the Octopus.

On January 1, 2021, he began his 2-year stint as the CEO of the first tier k-league football team Gangwon FC.

Playing career

Anyang LG Cheetahs 
Lee graduated from Konkuk University in Seoul, and began his professional career in a K League club Anyang LG Cheetahs, currently FC Seoul. He contributed to Anyang's K League title in 2000. His team also advanced to the Asian Club Championship final in the 2001–02 season, but failed to bring the title against Suwon Samsung Bluewings, another South Korean club. An impressive player in the league, Lee could play for the South Korean national team in the 2002 FIFA World Cup. He assisted South Korea's winning goals against Portugal and Italy with crosses. He followed Guus Hiddink and teammate Park Ji-sung into PSV Eindhoven after finishing the World Cup in fourth place.

PSV Eindhoven
At PSV, Lee flourished under Hiddink's guidance and soon established himself in PSV's first team. Known for his endurance, technique, and ability in both defence and attack, Lee was widely regarded as the best left-back in the Dutch Eredivisie. Lee and his compatriot Park were instrumental in PSV Eindhoven's run to the 2005 UEFA Champions League semi-final, although, to their disappointment, they were knocked out by Milan. Despite PSV's persistent attempts to keep him, Lee moved to the English club Tottenham Hotspur in August 2005. During his PSV career, Lee scored 1 goal and assisted 13 goals.

Tottenham Hotspur

At Tottenham, Lee was an immediate hit and earned a spot on the Premier League's best eleven in his debut week. Tottenham coach Martin Jol, at the time of his signing on 31 August 2005, touted him as "the best left-back in Holland." His form did however fluctuate in the 2005–06 season, despite being almost ever present in a defence which conceded the fourth lowest number of goals in that season.

In the beginning of 2006–07 season, Lee moved to right full-back due to Benoît Assou-Ekotto's impressive pre-season performance and an injury to regular right-back Paul Stalteri. Lee then faced increased competition when Tottenham signed French defender Pascal Chimbonda on the final day of the transfer period. Lee also suffered a knee injury and in August 2006, Tottenham offered his rights to Roma of Italy's Serie A, but he backed out at the last minute for "personal reasons". An Italian media report said religion played a part in his decision to reject the transfer offer. On 31 August 2006, Lee held a press conference in Korea and denied that religion was a factor in his decision. He said that moving to Roma would have been great for him in terms of football alone but he decided against it for personal reasons that he would not reveal, despite being pressed for answers by 50 attending reporters.

Lee regained his place in the first team when Assou-Ekotto's form began to falter, most notably in a very poor performance against arch-rivals Arsenal. Lee came on as a half-time substitute in that match and was a notable improvement, and was again preferred by Jol for the starting eleven, until a season-ending knee injury sustained in a UEFA Cup Quarterfinal match against Sevilla on 5 April.

On 9 August 2007, Tottenham manager Martin Jol announced that Lee would be "fit for selection" in "one or two weeks". On 18 August 2007, Lee made his first start of the season against Derby County. He continued to play regularly for Tottenham in the 2007–08 season, along with League Cup appearances against Blackpool, Manchester City and Arsenal. He missed the final but earned a medal for his contributions.

Borussia Dortmund
On 27 August 2008, Lee transferred to a Bundesliga club Borussia Dortmund for an undisclosed fee. He consistently made appearances early in the season, and Borussia Dortmund announced that the period of Lee's contract was extended to two years in December. However, he was benched after the vice-captain Dedé recovered from his injury.

Al-Hilal
On 10 July 2009, Lee left for a Saudi Arabian club Al-Hilal. Known to be a devout Christian, he decided to go to Saudi Arabia after hearing the word of God, although he didn't want to go there. He couldn't understand the will of God, but enjoyed his new life with Muslims. He told this interesting anecdote in his lecture after retirement.

Vancouver Whitecaps FC
Lee officially signed with Vancouver on 6 December 2011. He scored his first MLS goal for Vancouver on 28 April 2012 off a free kick against the Columbus Crew. Lee was a crucial part to Vancouver's 2012 season and was played as a right back. He was considered one of their best players on the team that year. Lee was awarded with Vancouver's 2012 Player of the Year on 21 October 2012 after helping the team become the first Canadian team to reach the MLS Cup Playoffs.

He played his final professional game on 27 October 2013 in Vancouver in 3–0 win against the Colorado Rapids. After scoring the first and eventual game-winning goal, 2013 MLS Golden Boot-winner Camilo Sanvezzo presented Lee with the ball during the goal celebration.

Career statistics

Club

International
 
Scores and results list Korea Republic's goal tally first, score column indicates score after each Lee goal.

Filmography

Television

Honours

Player 
Anyang LG Cheetahs
K League 1: 2000
Korean Super Cup: 2001
Asian Club Championship runner-up: 2001–02

PSV Eindhoven
Eredivisie: 2002–03, 2004–05
KNVB Cup: 2004–05
Johan Cruyff Shield: 2003

Tottenham Hotspur
Football League Cup: 2007–08

Al-Hilal
Saudi Professional League: 2009–10, 2010–11
Saudi Crown Prince Cup: 2009–10, 2010–11

South Korea U23
Asian Games bronze medal: 2002

South Korea
FIFA World Cup fourth place: 2002
AFC Asian Cup third place: 2000, 2011

Individual
K League 1 Best XI: 2001
Vancouver Whitecaps FC Player of the Year: 2012

Entertainer

See also
 List of men's footballers with 100 or more international caps

References

External links
 
 Lee Young-pyo – National Team Stats at KFA 
 
 Al Hilal Saudi Club
 
 
 International Appearances & Goals
 www.psvweb.nl profile 

1977 births
Living people
South Korean footballers
Association football fullbacks
South Korean expatriate footballers
South Korea under-23 international footballers
South Korea international footballers
FC Seoul players
PSV Eindhoven players
Tottenham Hotspur F.C. players
Borussia Dortmund players
Al Hilal SFC players
Vancouver Whitecaps FC players
K League 1 players
Eredivisie players
Premier League players
Bundesliga players
Major League Soccer players
Expatriate footballers in the Netherlands
Expatriate footballers in England
Expatriate footballers in Germany
Expatriate footballers in Saudi Arabia
Expatriate soccer players in Canada
2000 AFC Asian Cup players
2000 CONCACAF Gold Cup players
2001 FIFA Confederations Cup players
2002 CONCACAF Gold Cup players
2002 FIFA World Cup players
2004 AFC Asian Cup players
2006 FIFA World Cup players
2010 FIFA World Cup players
2011 AFC Asian Cup players
Footballers at the 2000 Summer Olympics
Olympic footballers of South Korea
FIFA Century Club
South Korean expatriate sportspeople in the Netherlands
South Korean expatriate sportspeople in England
South Korean expatriate sportspeople in the United Kingdom
South Korean expatriate sportspeople in Germany
South Korean expatriate sportspeople in Saudi Arabia
South Korean expatriate sportspeople in Canada
Konkuk University alumni
South Korean Christians
Asian Games medalists in football
Footballers at the 2002 Asian Games
Asian Games bronze medalists for South Korea
Medalists at the 2002 Asian Games
Saudi Professional League players
Sportspeople from Gangwon Province, South Korea